Benjamin Burton (1736-1763) was an Irish politician.

Burton was born in Dublin and educated at Eton and Trinity College, Dublin.

Burgh represented  County Sligo from 1757 until 1761 and Boyle from 1761 until his death.

References

1709 births
Politicians from Dublin (city)
1763 deaths
People educated at Eton College
Irish MPs 1727–1760
Irish MPs 1761–1768
Members of the Parliament of Ireland (pre-1801) for County Kilkenny constituencies
Members of the Parliament of Ireland (pre-1801) for County Carlow constituencies
Alumni of Trinity College Dublin
Members of the Privy Council of Ireland